Palm Beach County Fire Rescue is an ISO Class 1 department and one of the largest fire departments in the State of Florida. Palm Beach County Fire Rescue provides fire protection, Advanced Life Support emergency medical services, technical rescue, hazardous materials mitigation, aircraft rescue and firefighting, fire investigation, and 911 dispatching for unincorporated parts of Palm Beach County, Florida and 19 cities under contract.

History

Palm Beach County Fire Rescue was created on October 1, 1984, when the Palm Beach County Board of County Commissioners passed a resolution consolidating the existing fire districts in Palm Beach County. Prior to 1984 the following fire districts were in existence, covering mostly unincorporated Palm Beach County:
 Jupiter-Tequesta
 Juno Beach
 Old Dixie
 Military Park
 Southwest
 Trail Park
 Reservation
 Del Trail
 Canal Point
 Palm Beach International Airport

Chief Herman W. Brice Fire Rescue Complex
Named after the department's first Fire Chief, the Palm Beach County Fire Rescue Administration and Training complex is a 40-acre complex that houses Fire-Rescue's Administrative offices, training areas, and an apparatus and support building.  The complex, located at 405 Pike Road, includes multiple classrooms & conference rooms, a 6-story training tower, a -story Class A burn building, an emergency vehicle driving course, an extrication training area, Urban Search & Rescue (USAR) props, a 10-acre lake for drafting training, and a field of various full-scale liquefied petroleum (LP) gas props.

Structure 

The department is made up of 8 battalions which contain anywhere from 3 to 9 fire stations: 
 Battalion 1: 7 stations: serving the north county area (Jupiter, Juno Beach, Lake Park, Jupiter Farms, Palm Beach Country Estates).
 Battalion 2: 9 stations: serving the western county area (Royal Palm Beach, Wellington, Loxahatchee/Acreage, Loxahatchee Groves, Westlake).
 Battalion 3:  7 stations: serving Lake Worth, Lantana, Manalapan, South Palm Beach, Lake Clarke Shores.
 Battalion 4: 8 stations: serving suburban Boynton Beach, Suburban Delray Beach.
 Battalion 5: 7 stations: serving suburban Boca Raton (Boca West, Loggers Run, Mission Bay, Sandalfoot Cove).
 Battalion 7: 3 stations: serving the Glades area (Pahokee, Canal Point, Belle Glade, South Bay).
 Battalion 9: 3 stations: Station 34, Station 81 (Palm Beach International Airport), and Trauma Hawk.
 Battalion 10:  6 stations: serving unincorporated West Palm Beach, Lake Worth Beach, Palm Springs, Haverhill, Cloud Lake.

Each Battalion is managed by a District Chief, who oversees all 3 shifts in his/her respective Battalion.  At the shift level, each Battalion is supervised by a Battalion Chief and an EMS Captain.

The department operates the following pieces of apparatus:

 ALS Engines:   41
 ALS Squads:   2
ALS Rescues:   51
ALS Aerials:   6
Tenders:   4
Brush Trucks:      19
Special Operations (Heavy Rescues):   2
Airport Crash (ARFF):   4
Helicopters:   2
Light and Air:   1

Operations

Overview 

Along with the unincorporated areas of the county, PBCFR provides services for Belle Glade, Cloud Lake, Glen Ridge, Haverhill, Juno Beach, Jupiter, Lake Clarke Shores, Lake Park, Lake Worth Beach, Lantana, Loxahatchee Groves, Manalapan, Pahokee, Palm Springs, Royal Palm Beach, South Bay, South Palm Beach, Wellington and Westlake.

All line personnel are either dual-certified Firefighter/EMT's or Firefighter/Paramedics. All Engine Companies, Squad Companies, Truck Companies, Ladder Companies, and Rescue Companies are Advanced Life Support (ALS) units, which means that they are staffed daily with Paramedics.  The department's daily minimum staffing is 325 Firefighters.

Apparatus Types:
Engine Companies:   Pumpers that carry 750–1,000 gallons of water, firefighting equipment, and medical equipment.
Ladder Companies:   Conventional (Straight-Stick) Quints that carry approximately 500 gallons of water, firefighting equipment, and medical equipment.
Truck Companies:   Platform (Tower-Ladder) Quints that carry approximately 500 gallons of water, firefighting equipment, and medical equipment.
Squad Companies:   Pumpers that carry 750 gallons of water, firefighting equipment, medical equipment, and technical rescue equipment.
Rescue Companies:   Medical Transport units that carry firefighting equipment and medical equipment.
Tenders:   Pumper Tankers that carry 3,000 gallons of water and firefighting equipment.
Special Operations units:   Heavy Rescues that carry Dive Rescue, Technical Rescue, and HazMat response equipment.
Brush trucks:   Wildland Pumpers that carry up to 750 gallons of water and firefighting equipment.
Dragons:   ARFF Pumpers that carry foam and 3,000 gallons of water and firefighting equipment.

Special Operations
The department has two Special Operations apparatus, located at stations 19 and 34. These multipurpose units function as Heavy Rescues, HazMat units, and Mobile Command Centers on extended operations. Members of Special Operations are responsible for Hazardous Materials (HazMat), Dive Rescue, Confined Space Rescue, and High Angle Rescue response, and they assist the Sheriff's Office's Explosive Ordnance Disposal Team. Many members are also trained in Trench Rescue, Structural Collapse Rescue, and Vehicle Machinery Rescue (VMR). Each Special Operations station houses a Squad, a Rescue, and a Heavy Rescue.  Station 34, which is the headquarters for Battalion 9, also houses the Special Operations Battalion Chief, the Special Operations EMS Captain, and the Heavy Rescue Equipment vehicle, TRT 34.

Aerial Operations
All Ladder and Truck companies are Quints that incorporate ladder capabilities along with pumper functions.  These aerials carry Rope Rescue equipment, a large complement of saws, vehicle stabilization equipment, air lift bags, and assorted pneumatic and electrical tools that are not carried by Engine companies.  All personnel assigned full-time to aerial stations are certified at a minimum in Rope Rescue operations and Aerial operations.  Personnel assigned full-time to station 57 (Boca Raton) and station 73 (Belle Glade) are also certified Rescue Divers.  Aside from Special Operations, these are the only 2 stations in the department with regional Dive Rescue teams.

Airport Operations 
The PBCFR is responsible for providing aircraft rescue and firefighting for the Palm Beach International Airport, one the 50 busiest airports in the United States. The station which is located near the center of the airport grounds, is home to 13 pieces of specialized fire fighting equipment.

These apparatus include:
 An air stair which allows for assistance in deplaning in an emergency. 
 Four Airport crash tenders that go by the call sign Dragon (Dragon 1, Dragon 2, etc.).
 A foam unit that carries Purple-K concentrate to assist with extinguishing a fire.
 A heavy rescue vehicle that carries additional tools for a plane crash and other mass-casualty incidents.

Trauma Hawk 
The Palm Beach County Fire Rescue partners with the Palm Beach County Health Care District to operate the Trauma Hawk Aero-Medical Program. The Trauma Hawk program, established in November 1990, replaced the use of Palm Beach County Sheriff's Office helicopters to medevac critically injured patients to area hospitals. At the Trauma Hawk Station, located at the south west corner of Palm Beach International Airport, the department has two Sikorsky S-76C helicopters. The air ambulances are identically equipped and can carry two patients each and up to four medical attendants if needed. Each helicopter is staffed with a pilot, a registered nurse (RN) and a paramedic. The nurses and paramedics are Palm Beach County Fire Rescue employees while the pilots are Health Care District employees.

Support Services

Training & Safety Division 
The Training & Safety Division is responsible for the training and education of new Recruit Firefighters, existing Firefighters, and support personnel.  Areas of training include:
 Recruit Academy:   All newly hired firefighters attend a recruit academy, consisting of fire and EMS training, before working in the field.
 Company/Fire Officer Training:   Officer Development Academies (ODAs) provide new Lieutenants, Captains, and Chief Officers with essential job knowledge and skills to effectively operate in their new supervisory positions.
 Driver Operator Training:  Driver Candidate School (DCS) provides the basic fundamental knowledge and skills to operate pumping apparatus.  Additional training classes to operate specialized apparatus are also offered.
 EMS Training:   Annual EMT & Paramedic training covers basic and advanced medical skills (i.e. Airway Management, EKG Interpretation, Medication Administration) and Regional Protocol reviews.
 Fire Training:   Annual firefighter training includes Live-Burn, Search, Safety & Survival, Fire Suppression, Forcible Entry, and Ventilation training.
 Specialty Training:   Specialty units receive continuing training in Hazardous Materials (HazMat), Dive Rescue, and Technical Rescue / USAR.

Dispatch

In the 1980s, Palm Beach County became the second in the nation to implement enhanced 911 phone system, which provided critical information regarding the location of the emergency.  The dispatch center, known as the Alarm Office, processes all incoming calls and operates multiple radio channels.  In addition to a staff of over 40 communications personnel, trainers, and dispatch supervisors, a Fire Operations Officer (FOO) is assigned to the Alarm Office at all times. The purpose of the FOO is to provide technical assistance to dispatch during multi-company operations.

The department also provides dispatch services for 13 municipalities: Atlantis, Delray Beach, Greenacres, Gulf Stream, Highland Beach, Jupiter Inlet Colony, Mangonia Park, North Palm Beach, Palm Beach Gardens, Palm Beach Shores, Riviera Beach, Tequesta and West Palm Beach.

Bureau of Fire, Arson, and Explosive Investigations

Working under the Office of the Fire Marshal, the fire/arson investigators are responsible for investigating the cause & origin of fire/explosion scenes, preserving scenes, and collecting evidence. The investigators respond to all areas that are serviced by Palm Beach County Fire Rescue, in addition to, those areas serviced by the Palm Beach County Sheriff's Office. The investigators are sworn law enforcement officers, which gives them the ability to make arrests, carry firearms, and present cases to the State Attorney's office for prosecution of any bomb/fire/arson crimes. Investigators are also members of the Palm Beach County Bomb/Arson Task Force and are all professionally qualified to provide expert witness testimony in both criminal and civil cases.

Stations and apparatus

Gallery

References

Fire Department
Fire departments in Florida
Ambulance services in the United States
Medical and health organizations based in Florida